The 2018–19 Egyptian Second Division was the 39th edition of the Egyptian Second Division, the top Egyptian semi-professional level for football clubs, since its establishment in 1977. The season started on 8 August 2018 and concluded on 19 April 2019. Fixtures for the 2018–19 season were announced on 23 May 2018.

Aswan, FC Masr and Tanta won Group A, Group B and Group C respectively and secured the promotion to the 2019–20 Egyptian Premier League.

Team changes
The following teams have changed division since the 2017–18 season.

To Second Division
Promoted from Third Division

 El Tahrir
 MS Naser Malawy
 Tahta
 Media
 Porto Suez
 Damietta
 MS Tala
 Sidi Salem
 Al Jazeera

Relegated from Premier League

 El Raja
 Tanta
 Al Nasr

From Second Division
Relegated to Third Division

 KIMA Aswan
 Beni Mazar
 Qena
 Al Madina Al Monawara
 Al Salam
 El Sharkia
 National Bank
 Ittihad El Shorta
 Kahraba Ismailia
 Al Fanar
 Sherbeen
 MS Minyat Samanoud
 Ittihad Nabarouh
 Beni Ebeid
 MS Koum Hamada

Promoted to Premier League

 El Gouna
 Nogoom
 Haras El Hodoud

Teams
A total of forty-two teams competed in the league – thirty sides from the 2017–18 season, three relegated from the 2017–18 Egyptian Premier League and nine promoted from the 2017–18 Egyptian Third Division.

Note: Table lists in alphabetical order.

Group A

Group B

Notes

Group C

Results

League tables

Group A

Group B

Group C

Positions by round
The table lists the positions of teams after each week of matches. In order to preserve chronological evolvements, any postponed matches are not included in the round at which they were originally scheduled, but added to the full round they were played immediately afterwards. For example, if a match is scheduled for matchday 13, but then postponed and played between days 16 and 17, it will be added to the standings for day 16.

Group A

Group B

Group C

Results tables

Group A

Group B

Group C

References

Egyptian Second Division seasons
Egy
Egyptian Second Division